Calypso is the third studio album by recording artist Harry Belafonte, released by RCA Victor (LPM-1248) in 1956. The album became his second consecutive number-one album on the Billboard Top Pop Albums chart, where it peaked for 31 weeks. Calypso was the first Long Play record album to sell over one million copies.

In 2018, Calypso was selected for preservation in the National Recording Registry by the Library of Congress as being "culturally, historically, or artistically significant."

Album information
The first track "Day-O (Banana Boat Song)" largely contributed to the success of the album and has long been Belafonte's signature song, the single reaching number five on Billboard'''s Pop chart.
"Star-O", the sixth track on the album (and B side of the "Day-O" single), is essentially a short reprise of "Day-O", with slightly different lyrics.

It is sung from the point of view of dock workers working the night shift loading bananas onto ships. Daylight has come, the shift is over, and they want their work to be counted up so that they can return to their homes (this is the meaning of the lyric "Come, Mr. Tally Man, tally me banana / Daylight come and me wan' go home.")

The third track, "Jamaica Farewell", is a mento folk song about the beauties of the West Indian islands and a love left behind. This was the first album on which the song was published. The song was released as a single, reaching number 14 on Billboards Pop chart, becoming the second hit from the album.

Reception

Calypso was the first LP  record album to sell over one million copies. Several single records, including Glenn Miller's "Chattanooga Choo-Choo," Bing Crosby's "White Christmas," and Tennessee Ernie Ford's "Sixteen Tons" had surpassed 1 million copies previously. The album is number four on Billboard's "Top 100 Album" list for having spent 31 weeks at number 1, 58 weeks in the top ten, and 99 weeks on the U.S. charts. Allmusic gave the album 5 stars out of 5 and called it, "a record of inestimable influence".

Popular culture
Belafonte's original  1955 recording of "Day-O" was heard in the dinner scene in the Tim Burton film Beetlejuice (1988). Belafonte appeared in a "Day-O" music video, featured on MTV,  promoting the film.  "Man Smart (Woman Smarter)" was also featured in Beetlejuice as well as episodes of  The Simpsons and I Love Lucy.

Track listing

Personnel
Harry Belafonte – vocals
Millard J. Thomas – guitar (1, 4, 6, 7)
Frantz Casseus – guitar
Tony Scott and His Orchestra (2, 3, 5, 8, 9, 10, 11)
The Norman Luboff Choir (8, 9, 10)Production notes:'''
Ed Welker – producer
Herman Diaz Jr. – producer
Henri René – producer ("Man Smart (Woman Smarter)")
Tony Scott – conductor
Brock Peters – chorus leader
Roy Stevens – cover photo
William Attaway – liner notes

References 

1956 albums
Harry Belafonte albums
RCA Records albums
Albums produced by Henri René
United States National Recording Registry recordings
United States National Recording Registry albums